Daqiao is a town of Gutian County in mountainous northeastern Fujian province, China, located  east-northeast of the county seat in the west-central part of the county. , it has 36 villages under its administration.

See also 
 List of township-level divisions of Fujian

References 

Township-level divisions of Fujian
Gutian County